The  is a museum in Nagi, Okayama, Japan. It was jointly created by architect Arata Isozaki and artists whose works are displayed.

Exhibited works
The site features permanent installations. 
Shusaku Arakawa + Madeline Gins, Ubiquitous Site * Nagi’s Ryoanji * Architectural Body
Kazuo Okazaki, Hisashi
Aiko Miyawaki, Utsurohi

See also
Reversible destiny

References

External links
 

Museums in Okayama Prefecture
Contemporary art galleries in Japan
Cultural infrastructure completed in 1994
Art museums established in 1994
Modernist architecture in Japan
1994 establishments in Japan
Arata Isozaki buildings